Heckletooth Mountain is a summit in Lane County, Oregon, in the United States with an elevation of  . It is located just north of the Willamette Highway (OR 58), in the Willamette National Forest.

Heckletooth Mountain was so named in the 1870s by a pioneer settler who likened the rocks about its jagged peak to the teeth of a hackle, a tool used to process flax.

References

Mountains of Lane County, Oregon
Mountains of Oregon